Trauma is a 2004 British psychological thriller film directed by Marc Evans and written by Richard Smith.

Plot
Ben (Colin Firth) awakens from a coma to discover his wife has been killed in a car accident. A few weeks later, Ben is out of the hospital and, attempting to start a new life, he moves home and is befriended by a beautiful young neighbour Charlotte (Mena Suvari). Haunted by visions of his dead wife, Ben starts to lose his grip on reality.

Cast
Colin Firth as Ben
Mena Suvari as Charlotte
Naomie Harris as Elisa
Sean Harris as Roland
Neil Edmond as Mills
Tommy Flanagan as Tommy
Kenneth Cranham as Detective Constable Jackson
Brenda Fricker as Petra

Critical reaction
The film is described by critics as a psychological thriller in the same vein as David Cronenberg, Memento, and Jacob's Ladder; however, most find that the film pales in comparison, with Eye Weekly calling it "just another pretentious Jacob's Ladder knockoff." The film has been described as stylish, with iofilm calling it "a triumph of style over content." Shadows on the Wall adds, "Evans fills the screen with... moody, atmospheric, and evocative visuals," and Filmcritic.com says the film has "The Ring-inspired creepy imagery."

Neil Young's Film Lounge describes the film's visual in this way: "Evans (along with cinematographer John Mathieson, production-designer Richard Smith and editor Mags Arnold) tries desperately to jazz everything up, deploying all manner of distorted visuals - extreme camera angles and close-ups, plus over-atmospheric lighting effects and jagged cuts - in a strenuous attempt to get us into Ben's tormented state-of-mind."

Colin Firth's performance is the most praised aspect of the film. "He delivers a performance which highlights the range of his considerable talent" cites one critic. eFilmCritic says Firth "does the best with what he's given" and iofilm says, "Firth puts in a sterling performance in the central role." Reel Film Reviews adds "Firth's performance, not surprisingly, is the best thing about the movie, and the actor does a nice job of portraying Ben's increasing paranoia."

Film festivals
Listed Chronologically
Sundance Film Festival
Cannes Film Market
Edinburgh Film Festival
Toronto International Film Festival
Lund Fantastisk Film Festival
Athens Film Festival
Gérardmer Fantasticarts Film Festival
Brussels International Festival of Fantasy Films
München Fantasy Filmfest

References

External links
Trauma Official Site

 
 

BBC Film films
2004 films
2004 psychological thriller films
British psychological thriller films
Films directed by Marc Evans
Films scored by Alex Heffes
2000s English-language films
2000s British films